Fermentibacteria (formerly Hyd24-12) is a bacterial phylum with candidate status. It is part of the FCB group.

The original clone sequence used to define Fermentibacteria as a phylum (AJ535232) was recovered from the Hydrate Ridge cold seep environment (Cascadia Margin, offshore from OR, USA). The first genomes from this phylum were recovered from samples of full-scale mesophilic anaerobic digesters at Danish wastewater treatment facilities. All three genomes recovered were inferred to represent organisms that rely on fermentation of simple sugars as an energy source, and thus the name "Fermentibacteria" (as in "to ferment") was proposed.

Members of this phylum have been detected in a broad range of environments, including methane seeps, coral reef sands, and the dolphin mouth.

Taxonomy
 Class "Fermentibacteria" Kirkegaard 2016
 Order "Fermentibacterales" Kirkegaard 2016
 Family "Fermentibacteraceae" Kirkegaard 2016
 Genus "Candidatus Fermentibacter" Kirkegaard 2016
 Species "Ca. F. daniensis" Kirkegaard 2016
 Genus "Candidatus Sabulitectum" Saad et al. 2017
 Species "Ca. S. silens" Saad et al. 2017

References 

Candidatus taxa
Bacteria phyla